Murex (Murex) singaporensis is a species of large predatory sea snail, a marine gastropod mollusk in the family Muricidae, the rock snails or murex snails.

References

 Indo-Pacific Molluscan Database :    Murex (Murex) singaporensis

Gastropods described in 1853
Murex